Canadian singer/songwriter Esthero has released three studio albums, two extended plays, and seven singles as a lead artist. Her debut album, Breath from Another, was released with Doc McKinney in 1998. The album initially unsuccessful, though it eventually managed to sell more than 110,000 copies in the US and more than 50,000 in Canada. The record spawned three singles: "Breath from Another", "Heaven Sent", and "That Girl". "Heaven Sent" went into moderate rotation on MTV and peaked in the top 5 on the Hot Dance Breakouts Single Sales chart. Breath from Another received a nomination at the 1999 Juno Awards, in the category of "Best Alternative Album." However, it lost to Rufus Wainwright's eponymous debut album.

After her label, Work Group, was consumed by a larger label, Esthero was released from her contract; in the years between her dropping from the label and the release of her next EP, she provided guest vocals for songs by a variety of artists, including Ian Pooley, Nelly Furtado, and Black Eyed Peas. Her Black Eyed Peas collaboration, "Weekends," gave her her first chart entry in the US; it peaked at number 64 on the Hot R&B/Hip-Hop Singles Sales chart. Her Ian Pooley collaboration, "Balmes (A Better Life)", was a top 75 hit on the UK Singles Chart; it also gave her her first top 40 hit on the US Dance Club Songs chart. She also recorded a solo song, "O.G. Bitch", which was released in 2004 and topped the US Dance Club Songs chart.

In 2004, she released an EP titled We R In Need of a Musical Revolution. The EP was met with praise from critics and spawned a single of the same name; the video went into rotation on MuchMusic Canada. The following year, she released her sophomore album, Wikked Lil' Grrrls, which spawned the hit single "Fastlane", which earned Esthero a second top 5 hit on the Dance Club Songs chart. After the release of the album, Esthero continued to provide guest vocals, and wrote music for other artists, including Kanye West and Kidz in the Hall. She finally returned with solo material in 2012 with Everything Is Expensive, which she funded using pledges from PledgeMusic. The album spawned one single, "Never Gonna Let You Go", which was a minor hit in Canada, earning her her first chart entry there.

Studio albums

Extended plays

Singles

As lead artist

As featured artist

Other charted songs

Other guest appearances

Music videos

References

Discographies of Canadian artists
Pop music discographies
Rhythm and blues discographies
Electronic music discographies